Jawi or Djawi or Djaui, is a nearly extinct dialect of the Bardi language of Western Australia, the traditional language of the Jawi people. There are no longer any known fluent speakers, but there may be some partial speakers.

The name has also been spelt Chowie, Djaoi, Djau, Dyao, and Dyawi.

Classification
Jawi is a Non-Pama–Nyungan language of the Nyulnyulan family, most closely related to Bardi. Bowern discusses how Jawi and Bardi may have converged within the last hundred years. Jawi people were hit hard by influenza in the early years of the 20th century. Their traditional lands are Sunday Island and the islands of the Buccaneer Archipelago to the northeast.

References

Cited references

General references

 
 
 Bird, W.; Hadley, S. (not dated). "Native vocabulary: Sunday Island", unpublished manuscript.

Further reading

Nyulnyulan languages